Ockle is a remote hamlet, situated on the northcoast of the Ardnamurchan peninsula, Scottish Highlands and is in the Scottish council area of Highland.

The public road ends in Ockle.

There is a  footpath running between Ockle (NM555704) and the public road at Arivegaig (NM651677) ( from Acharacle)

The current population of Ockle is 1.

Populated places in Lochaber
Ardnamurchan